O'Dowd Lake is a lake in Scott County, in the U.S. state of Minnesota.

O'Dowd Lake bears the name of the three O'Dowd brothers, pioneers who settled there.

See also
List of lakes in Minnesota

References

Lakes of Minnesota
Lakes of Scott County, Minnesota